Shijie may refer to:

Geographical locations
Shijie, Anhui (誓节), a town in Guangde County, Anhui, China
Shijie, Guangdong (石碣), a town in Dongguan, Guangdong, China
Shijie Yi Ethnic Township (十街彝族乡), a township in Yimen County, Yunnan, China

Other uses
The Anger (失節), a 1982 Taiwanese film directed by Chen Yao-chi
The World (film) (世界), a 2004 Chinese film directed by Jia Zhangke
Shijie (Daoism), "liberation by means of a simulated corpse" techniques for achieving transcendence

See also
Jie Schöpp (born 1968), born Shi Jie, Chinese-born German table tennis player